The 1911 Mississippi A&M Aggies baseball team represented the Mississippi Aggies of Mississippi A&M in the 1911 NCAA baseball season.

Schedule and results

References

Mississippi State Bulldogs
Mississippi State Bulldogs baseball seasons
Southern Intercollegiate Athletic Association baseball champion seasons